Downholland is a civil parish in the West Lancashire district of Lancashire, England.  It contains eight listed buildings that are recorded in the National Heritage List for England.  All the listed buildings are designated at Grade II, the lowest of the three grades, which is applied to "buildings of national importance and special interest".  The parish contains the villages of Barton, Haskayne and Downholland Cross, and is otherwise rural.  The Leeds and Liverpool Canal passes through the parish.  Two milestones by the towpath of the canal are listed, and the other listed buildings are houses and associated structures.


Buildings

References

Citations

Sources

Lists of listed buildings in Lancashire
Buildings and structures in the Borough of West Lancashire